Wazobia 99.5 FM Abuja is a  Nigerian Pidgin English radio station in Abuja. It was founded in 2007 and belongs to Globe Communications Limited.

Wazobia FM Abuja airs a mixture of news, features, sports, music (from popular Nigerian music, hip hop, highlife to world music and reggae), talk shows, topical issues and interviews.

See also
 List of radio stations in Nigeria
 Wazobia FM Lagos
 Wazobia FM Onitsha
 Wazobia FM Port Harcourt

References

External links
 

Radio stations in Abuja
Radio stations in Nigeria
2007 establishments in Nigeria
Radio stations established in 2007
Privately held companies of Nigeria
World music radio stations
Wazobia FM